Saila Laakkonen is a Finnish actress who acted in the popular Finnish soap series Salatut elämät (2006–2007) and its spinoff Romeo & Rafael Desperados (2008).  In the series she played a teenager mother Emma Ilola. She has also performed in the TV movie Espoon viimeinen neitsyt aka "Suburban Virgin".

References

External links
 

Finnish actresses
Living people
Year of birth missing (living people)